River Oaks Center is a shopping mall located at the southeast corner of River Oaks Drive and Torrence Avenue  in Calumet City, Illinois, a suburb south of Chicago. River Oaks Center is the seventh largest in the Chicago metropolitan area totaling . Today, there are over 140 stores and two anchors including JCPenney and Macy's with two vacant anchors last occupied by Carson Pirie Scott and Sears. Namdar Realty Group and Mason Asset Management manages and owns River Oaks Center.

History 
It opened in 1966 and was a development of KLC Ventures, a firm that included the pioneering developer Philip M. Klutznick and his son Tom. The elder Klutznick had developed Park Forest, Illinois, after World War II, as well as Oakbrook Center in Oak Brook in 1959 and Old Orchard Shopping Center in Skokie in 1956.

River Oaks originally opened as an outdoor mall with one minor and two major department stores. The original anchors were Marshall Field's, which built a  store, Sears, and a branch of Edward C. Minas Company, which was based in nearby Hammond, Indiana. Other major stores included a Jewel supermarket and Osco Drug at the south end, and a S. S. Kresge dime store next to Sears. Kresge closed in 1987 and became a movie theater, while the closure of Jewel made way for a McDonald's restaurant and a second theater complex. Many of the stores in the mall in its first 20 years were outposts of Chicago retailers, including  Chas A. Stevens, Kroch's and Brentano's and C.D. Peacock. Carson Pirie Scott took over the Edward C. Minas store in 1982.

In 1985, the mall was expanded when JCPenney moved its store from downtown Hammond, Indiana, to the northwest portion of the mall's parking lot. A new wing was also built to connect JCPenney to the mall and a food court was added on the enclosed lower level.

Expansion
In the late 1980s and early 1990s, the then owner, JMB Corp. of Chicago, had several plans to expand and enclose the outdoor mall. These plans included adding a second level and possibly a fifth department store at the end of the southeastern wing of the mall. These plans coincided with Chicago's Lake Calumet Airport which would have been just a few miles north of the mall and would have transformed the area around the mall into an office and business hub. However, these plans never materialized and finally, in 1993, JMB began a smaller version of the redevelopment which included additional retail space and enclosing the common areas mall.

In 1994, the redevelopment was completed. New retailers opened at the mall and the tenant mix became more upscale bringing in some retailers who had not yet located in the Southern Suburbs. The mall's size was brought up to  making it the largest mall in the South Suburbs.

Carson Pirie Scott closed in January 2013. Sears closed on June 9, 2013. 

On June 4, 2020, JCPenney announced that it would be closing as part of a plan to close 154 stores nationwide. However as of August 2020, this store is no longer on the closing list and will stay open.

In late 2019, new anchor to the southeast wing of the mall has been proposed as the Southland Live Casino.  If approved and selected by the Illinois Gaming Board, a temporary casino will initially open in the former Carson's store space until the permanent 150,000 square foot casino is constructed, followed in the future by a 200 room hotel.  The site was expected to be approved by October 2020 but the decision has been delayed due to the COVID-19 pandemic.

Bus routes 
Pace

  353 95th/Dan Ryan CTA/Calumet City/Homewood  
  358 Torrence  
  364 159th Street

References

Shopping malls established in 1966
Calumet City, Illinois
Shopping malls in Cook County, Illinois
1966 establishments in Illinois
Namdar Realty Group